The following is a list of destroyers and large torpedo boats of Germany. In naval terminology, a destroyer is a fast and maneuverable yet long-endurance warship intended to escort larger vessels in a fleet, convoy or battle group and defend them against smaller, powerful, short-range attackers. In the years prior to World War I the small attacking vessel was the torpedo boat, while the defender was termed a torpedo boat destroyer. In practice the destroyer, being also armed with torpedoes, came to replace the torpedo boat in its attacking function, as well as executing its protecting role. 

In the Imperial German Navy, there was no clear distinction between torpedo boats and torpedo boat destroyers, which were all numbered in the same series, the number being preceded by a letter that represented the building contractor. A new numbering series began in 1911; hence years of construction are appended in brackets below, to distinguish the two series.

Kaiserliche Marine 
 1898 Type Large Torpedo Boat
 S90-class torpedo boat
 G108-class torpedo boat
 S114-class torpedo boat
 S120-class torpedo boat
 S126-class torpedo boat
 G132-class torpedo boat
 G137-class torpedo boat
 1906 Type Large Torpedo Boat
 S138-class torpedo boat
 V150-class torpedo boat
 V162-class torpedo boat
 S165-class torpedo boat
 G169-class torpedo boat
 S176-class torpedo boat
 V180-class torpedo boat
 G192-class torpedo boat
 1911 Type Large Torpedo Boat
 V1-class destroyer
 G7-class destroyer
 S13-class destroyer
 1913 Type Large Torpedo Boat
 V25-class destroyer
 S31-class destroyer
 G37-class destroyer
 V43-class destroyer
 S49-class destroyer
 V67-class destroyer
 G85-class destroyer
 1914 Type Destroyer
 B97-class destroyer
 G101-class destroyer
 V105-class destroyer
 1916 Type Large Torpedo Boat
 S113-class destroyer
 1916 Mob Large Torpedo Boat
 V125-class destroyer
 S131-class destroyer
 H145-class destroyer

Kriegsmarine 

 Mowe-class destroyer
 Zerstörer/Typ 1934
 Zerstörer/Typ 1934 A
 Zerstörer/Typ 1936
 Zerstörer/Typ 1936 A
 Zerstörer/Typ 1936 A (Mob)
 Zerstörer/Typ 1936 B

Post war Bundesmarine 
 Type 101 Hamburg class
 Type 103 Lütjens class

Germany
Destroyers of Germany
Destroyer